The Ivailovgrad lake is one of the largest water reservoirs in Bulgaria. It is located in the eastern Rhodope Mountains.  The area is rich in natural phenomenon of caverns and historical monuments, and offers nature lovers  opportunities for water sports, bird watching, recreation and mountain hiking.

The reservoir has been created by Ivaylovgrad dam, which has been built from 1959 until 1964 for the purpose of electricity generation.

References
https://web.archive.org/web/20070926223514/http://toursbg.net/bulgaria-guide/ivailovgrad-reservoir/

External links
Movie about The Ivailovgrad lake area

Tourist attractions in Haskovo Province
Reservoirs in Bulgaria
Landforms of Haskovo Province